Al Rams Club is a professional football club located in Rams suburb of Ras Al Khaimah, United Arab Emirates. They currently play in the UAE First Division League.

Current squad

As of UAE Division One:

Honours
 UAE Division One: 2
 1975–76, 1980–81

References

External links 

 

Football clubs in the United Arab Emirates
Rams
Sport in the Emirate of Ras Al Khaimah